White-le-Head is a village in County Durham, in England, situated in close proximity to the village of Tantobie. It is located on the opposite side of the Tanfield valley to Stanley.

Villages in County Durham
Stanley, County Durham